Nathan Stapley is an American artist.  He was the lead artist on Double Fine's adventure game Broken Age and has worked on Psychonauts and Psychonauts 2.

Career
Nathan Stapley started his career at LucasArts as an artist on Indiana Jones and the Infernal Machine and Star Wars Episode I: Racer.  He left LucasArts to work at LucasArts-alumnus Tim Schafer's studio, Double Fine Productions, as an artist.

He created a comic while at Double Fine called My Comic About Me.  This comic spawned a free Flash sports game parody called My Game About Me: Olympic Challenge, which was developed by Klint Honeychurch with art by Stapley.

He was working on Broken Age in the role of lead artist and has also been an artist on Psychonauts and Psychonauts 2. A poster created by Stapley was included as one of the reward tiers in the Broken Age Kickstarter campaign.

Recognition
My Game About Me: Olympic Challenge received more attention than usual for a free online flash game.

The Broken Age (working title Double Fine Adventure) Kickstarter campaign was the most successful Kickstarter project at the time, having attracted more backers than any prior effort in the site's history.

Games
1999 Indiana Jones and the Infernal Machine, artist (LucasArts)
1999 Star Wars Episode I: Racer, artist (LucasArts)
2000 Escape from Monkey Island, artist (LucasArts)
2002 Star Wars: Bounty Hunter, artist (LucasArts)
2005 Psychonauts, artist (Double Fine)
2008 My Game About Me: Olympic Challenge, lead artist (Double Fine)
2009 Brütal Legend, artist (Double Fine)
2010 Costume Quest, artist (Double Fine)
2013 Broken Age, lead artist (Double Fine)
2021 Psychonauts 2, artist (Double Fine)

References

External links
 
My Comic About Me at the Double Fine web site
My Game About Me: Olympic Challenge at the Double Fine web site

Year of birth missing (living people)
American artists
Living people
Lucasfilm people
Double Fine people